Necdet Menzir (1945 in Bursa – 2 February 2013) was a Turkish bureaucrat and politician who served as Minister of Transport from 1997 to 1998, having been Istanbul Chief of Police (1992–1995). He died from respiratory failure at an Istanbul hospital on 2 February 2013, at the age of 68.

References

1945 births
2013 deaths
Ministers of Transport and Communications of Turkey
Government ministers of Turkey
Deputies of Istanbul
Turkish police chiefs
People from Bursa
Members of the 20th Parliament of Turkey